Blue Eagles Football Club is a Malawian football (soccer) club based in Lilongwe that currently plays in the TNM Super League, the top division of Malawian football.

History
Blue Eagles FC was founded in 1988 and is sponsored by the Malawi Police Service as tool to bring interaction between the community they serve and them.

The Cops clinched their first trophy, Chibuku Cup, in 1995, defeated Bata Bullets with 2–0 at the Civo Stadium.

Blue Eagles finished 8th in the top flight in the 2011–12 season and won the 2011 Standard Bank Cup after 2–1 victory over Moyale Barracks at the Silver Stadium in Lilongwe.

The 2019 season saw "The Cops" finished 3rd in the Super League, won the FISD Challenge Cup and qualified for the 2020–21 CAF Confederation Cup, but declined to participate in the competition.

On 21 December 2020, Blue Eagles has announced the appointment of Gerald Phiri as Head Coach, replaced Deklerk Msakakuona who took over as the coach for the Under 17 Malawi National Football Team.

In November 2021, following a poor season in which they survived relegation in the final match, Blue Eagles replaced Gerald Phiri with Christopher Sibale.

Stadium
Currently the team plays at the 5000 capacity Nankhaka Stadium which is situated in Area 30 at National Police Headquarters in Lilongwe.

Honours
Super League of Malawi: 
 Runners-up (1): 2022

Malawi FAM Cup
 Winners (2): 2011, 2019

Airtel Top 8 Cup
 Winners (1): 2018

Bingu Ikhome Cup
 Winners (1): 2019

Malawi Carlsberg Cup
 Winners (1): 2012

Tutulane Charity Cup
 Runners-up (1): 2007

Chibuku Cup
 Winners (1): 1995

Players

Current squad

References

External links
Club profile - Soccerway.com
Tag archives - Nyasatimes.com
Football clubs in Malawi
Police association football clubs in Malawi